Mayotte Magnus (born 1934) is a French-born photographer and Fellow of the Royal Photographic Society, who has lived most of her adult life in England. She has exhibited at the Fonds national d'art contemporain (1974), the National Portrait Gallery (1977) and the Institute of Contemporary Arts (1981).

Biography

After spending her early years in Paris, she settled in Cambridge, England, in 1959 on her marriage to George Magnus.

She started her career as a photographer in 1971, having previously been focusing on classical dance, classical guitar, choreography and painting. In 1972 she won two prizes in the Ilford International competition. She became a fellow of the Royal Photographic Society in 1973, and the following year had a one-woman show at Fnac, Paris.

In 1977 the National Portrait Gallery (NPG) commissioned her to photograph 100 eminent British women of her choice, with the resultant portraits being shown for two months in an exhibition (21 October–11 December). Choosing not only women well known to the public, Magnus rather selected her subjects "for the nature of their achievements. Each one has, by developing her own interests and talents, contributed to the community, and in working for personal fulfilment has brought benefit to others." Among the women included were Judi Dench, Margaret Drabble, Erin Pizzey, Margaret Busby, Laura Ashley, Mary Quant, Lynn Seymour, Marina Warner, Fay Godwin, Iris Murdoch, Elisabeth Lutyens, Julia Neuberger, Shirley Williams, Dorothy Hodgkin, Jessica Mitford, Edna O'Brien, Kathleen Raine, Molly Parkin, Christina Foyle, Marjorie Proops, and  Dame Barbara Hepworth. It was the first photographic exhibition in the Gallery’s history to focus exclusively on female achievement, and in September 2018 a selection of the portraits was mounted in a new display at the NPG. 

She divorced her first husband in 1974, and during the late 1970s/early '80s Magnus married the photographer Jorge Lewinski (1921–2008) with whom she collaborated on a series of photographically illustrated books.  Lewinski died in 2008.

The building contains a large number of paintings and photographs.

Selected exhibitions
1972: Paris, La Fnac.
1973: Istanbul, Hotel Intercontinental
1977: London, National Portrait Gallery – Eminent British Women
1978: London, Great Hall in Parliament: Women, for the 50 Years of Women’s Vote
1979: USA, San Francisco, Focus Gallery, with Jorge (Yuri) Lewinski and Yusuf Karsh
1980: London, Institute of Contemporary Art, Women’s Images of Men
2004: Seventy portraits of the inhabitants of the village of Alan, showing a French village at the turn of the millennium.
2005: The Seven Ages of Woman, taking William Shakespeare’s theme, Seven Ages of Man, a 30-year retrospective.
2008: France: Carla Bayle: Photographer of the month of Photography
2016: L’oeil de Proust at l’Espace Bonnefoy, Toulouse, France
Noirs sur Blancs at Maison Patrimoniale de Barthète, Boussan
2018, 8 September–24 March 2019: Illuminating Women, National Portrait Gallery

References

External links
 Official website

French women photographers
1934 births
Living people